Bethau is a village and a former municipality in the Wittenberg district in Saxony-Anhalt, Germany. Since 1 January 2011, it is part of the town Annaburg. It lies right on the boundary with Saxony about 35 km southeast of the district seat at Wittenberg and 12 km north of Torgau. Bethau was part of the administrative municipality (Verwaltungsgemeinschaft) of Annaburg-Prettin.

Geography and transport
Bethau lies in the lowlands on the east bank of the Elbe west of the Annaburg Heath. This is, however, to a great extent a Bundeswehr troop drilling ground, and is therefore off limits. West of the municipality runs the Federal Highway (Bundesstraße) B 182, and to the north is the B 187. In the south, the municipality borders on Saxony.

History
Bethau is believed to have been founded in 1159 by Flemish migrants. They were settled in the area by Wichmann von Seeburg, Archbishop of Magdeburg, and Albert the Bear. Before his exile to Switzerland then emigration to the USA, 19th-century communist Friedrich Sorge had been a resident of Bethau where he was born in 1828.

References

Former municipalities in Saxony-Anhalt
Annaburg